Chram (also spelled Chramn, Chramm, Old Frankish for "raven"; Latin: Chramnus, modern French: Chramn(e)) (died 561) was the son of Chlothar I, a Merovingian king of the Franks (r. 558-561), and his fifth wife, Chunsina.

Chram rose in rebellion against his father on several occasions. Following one of these rebellions, he fled with his wife and children to the court of Chanao, the ruler of Brittany. In pursuit of Chram, Chlothar defeated the combined forces of Chanao and his son in battle. Chanao was killed, and Chram, delayed in making his escape by sea because of his concern for his family's safety, was captured. Chlothar gave orders to burn them alive, but Chram was strangled and his body was placed in a cottage, which was subsequently burned. Chlothar reportedly died of remorse later that year.

References
Translator's note: These are in French

Sources

Gregory of Tours Book IV chapter 20 at The Medieval Sourcebook
  Jean Charles L. Simonde de Sismondi, Histoire de la chute de l'Empire Romain et du déclin de la civilisation, de l'an 250 à l'an 1000, Paris: Treuttel et Würtz, 1835. 
This article uses text translated from the Dictionnaire Bouillet — a French work which is in the public domain because the copyright has expired in the United States, France, and other countries where the copyright expires 100 years or more after the author's death.

561 deaths
Frankish warriors
Merovingian dynasty
Year of birth unknown
Rebellious princes